I'll Take Care of You is the fourth solo album by former Screaming Trees vocalist Mark Lanegan. This album consists of cover songs.

Recording
The album features Lanegan's interpretation of songs from a wide variety of songwriters, including Tim Rose, Tim Hardin, Booker T. Jones, and Buck Owens.  I'll Take Care Of You also includes the traditional song "Little Sadie."  A review from NME said: "it's probably his finest, most tenderly-delivered work to date."  Pitchfork Medias Neil Lieberman said this about the album: "In this collection, Lanegan's managed to tug on the timeless threads that hold the patchwork of American music together. And that's certainly something to consider."  The album opener "Carry Home" was composed by Jeffrey Lee Pierce, with whom Lanegan would write "Kimiko's Dream House," which would appear on his next album Field Songs.

The title song was featured in an episode of Veronica Mars's third season entitled "There's Got To Be A Morning After Pill".

Reception
Steve Huey of AllMusic:  "It's a testament to Lanegan's interpretive skill that he's able to use his already well-established style so effectively yet again, as most of these versions range from stunning to merely excellent."

Track listing

Personnel
Mark Lanegan - vocals
Mike Johnson - guitar
Steve Berlin - organ, flute, piano
Mark Boquist - drums
Van Conner - bass
Martin Feveyear - organ, percussion, piano, producer, engineer, mixing, Wurlitzer
Mark Hoyt - acoustic and electric guitar, vocals
David Krueger - violin
Barrett Martin - percussion, vibraphone
Mark Pickerel - drums
Ben Shepherd - bass
Technical
Brett Eliason - engineer
Greg Calbi - mastering
Jeff Kleinsmith - layout design
Chris Takino - A&R
Stanford Wilson - photography

References

1999 albums
Albums produced by Martin Feveyear
Beggars Banquet Records albums
Mark Lanegan albums
Covers albums
Sub Pop albums